Martin Luke Oduor-Otieno is a certified public secretary, accountant, businessman, entrepreneur and former bank executive in Kenya. He is the current chairman and CEO of Leadership Group Limited, a Nairobi-based consulting firm, that he founded. He previously served as the Group CEO of Kenya Commercial Bank Group, from 2007 until 2012.

Background and education
He was born in Kenya, circa 1956. Oduor-Otieno holds a Bachelor of Commerce in finance and accounting from the University of Nairobi. He also holds an Executive MBA, awarded jointly by the Eastern and Southern African Management Institute and Maastricht Business School. He attended upper management courses at Harvard Business School. He is a Certified Public Accountant and was awarded an Honorary Doctorate in Business Leadership by KCA University in Nairobi, Kenya.

Career
In 1999, he was one of the individuals selected by President Daniel Arap Moi, to "turn the economy around". From 2007 until 2012, he served as group chief executive of Kenya Commercial Bank Group, Kenya's largest banking conglomerate. Between May 2013 until March 2016, he served at Deloitte Kenya, as a senior advisor in the financial services division. In March 2016, he left Deloitte and took up an appointment as a non-executive director of Standard Bank Group, the financial services conglomerate based in South Africa. In August 2016 he founded Leadership Group Limited, a firm that offers coaching to businesses and individuals in the areas of leadership, governance, strategy and execution.

Other responsibilities
Oduor-Otieno has in the past, or currently serves on the boards of the following businesses:

 Standard Bank Group
 British American Tobacco Kenya
 East African Breweries Limited

See also
 Kenya Commercial Bank Group
 KCB Bank Kenya Limited
 Standard Bank of South Africa

References

External links
 Website of Kenya Commercial Bank Group
 Autobiography

Living people
1956 births
Kenyan accountants
Kenyan businesspeople
Luo people
Kenyan bankers
University of Nairobi alumni
Eastern and Southern African Management Institute alumni
Maastricht University alumni
Kenyan chief executives